Thoracocharax is a genus of freshwater hatchetfishes found in the Amazon, Orinoco and Paraná basins in South America.  These fish live just under the surface of the water.

Species
FishBase recognizes two species in the genus Thoracocharax:
Thoracocharax securis (De Filippi, 1853) (Giant hatchetfish)
Thoracocharax stellatus (Kner, 1858) (Spotfin hatchetfish)

References

Gasteropelecidae
Fish of South America
Taxa named by Henry Weed Fowler
Thoracocharax